The Greenwich Peninsula is an area of Greenwich in South East London, England. It is bounded on three sides by a loop of the Thames, between the Isle of Dogs to the west and Silvertown to the east. To the south is the rest of Greenwich, to the south-east is Charlton.

Formerly known as Greenwich Marshes and as Bugsby's Marshes, it became known as East Greenwich as it developed in the 19th century, but more recently has been called North Greenwich due to the location of the North Greenwich Underground station. This should not be confused with North Greenwich on the Isle of Dogs, at the north side of a former ferry from Greenwich. The peninsula's northernmost point on the riverside is known as Blackwall Point, and this may have led to the name Blackwall Peninsula sometimes being used in the late 20th century.

Landmarks include The Dome (also known by the current corporate logo The O2 and previously the Millennium Dome) and the southern end of the Blackwall Tunnel, but the area is now being substantially redeveloped with new homes, offices, schools, parks and Ravensbourne University London, a media and design university built on the peninsula in 2010, neighbouring The O2.

History

The peninsula was drained by Dutch engineers in the 16th century, allowing it to be used as pasture land. In the 17th century, Blackwall Point (the northern tip of the peninsula, opposite Blackwall) gained notoriety as a location where pirates' corpses were hung in cages as a deterrent to other would-be pirates. In the 1690s the Board of Ordnance established a gunpowder magazine on the west side of the peninsula, which was in operation by 1695 serving as the government's primary magazine (where newly milled powder was stored prior to being distributed, on board specially equipped hoys, to wherever it was needed). Alongside the magazine were a wharf, a proof house and accommodation for the resident Storekeeper. From the early 18th century, however, local residents began petitioning Parliament, asking for the magazine (and its dangerous contents in particular) to be removed; this eventually led to the establishment of a new set of Royal Gunpowder Magazines down river at Purfleet, which was opened in 1765. By 1771 gunpowder was no longer stored at Greenwich, though the buildings remained in situ for some decades afterwards.

The peninsula was steadily industrialised from the early 19th century onwards. In 1857 a plan was presented to Parliament for a huge dock occupying much of the peninsula, connected to Greenwich Reach to the west and Bugsby's Reach to the east, but this came to nothing. Early industries included Henry Blakeley's Ordnance Works making heavy guns, with other sites making chemicals, submarine cables, iron boats, iron and steel. Henry Bessemer built a steel works in the early 1860s to supply the London shipbuilding industry, but this closed as a result of a fall in demand due to the financial crisis of 1866. Later came oil mills, shipbuilding (for example the 1870 clippers Blackadder and Hallowe'en built by Maudslay), boiler making, manufacture of Portland cement and linoleum (Bessemer's works became the Victoria linoleum works) and the South Metropolitan Gas company's huge East Greenwich Gas Works. Early in the 20th century came bronze manufacturers Delta Metals and works making asbestos and 'Molassine Meal' animal feed.

For over 100 years the peninsula was dominated by the gasworks which primarily produced town gas, also known as coal gas. The site had its own extensive railway system connected to the main railway line near Charlton, and a large jetty used to unload coal and load coke. There were two huge gas holders, of 8.6 and 12.2 million ft3 (240,000 m3 and 345,000 m3). The larger holder, originally the largest in the world, was reduced to 8.9 million ft3 (250,000 m3) when it was damaged in the Silvertown explosion in 1917, but was still the largest in England until it was damaged again by a Provisional Irish Republican Army bomb in 1978. Originally manufacturing gas from coal, the plant began to manufacture gas from oil in the 1960s. Its peak production of 400 million ft3 per day (11.3 million m3) in the mid 1960s is believed to have been the largest of any single site in the world. The discovery of natural gas reserves in the North Sea soon rendered the complex obsolete.

On the eastern shore was Blackwall Point Power Station; the original station from the 1890s was replaced in the 1950s by a new station which ceased operation in about 1981. On the western shore, a large area including the site of the Victoria linoleum works later became the Victoria Deep Water Terminal in 1966, handling container traffic.

At the southwestern end of the peninsula Enderby's Wharf was occupied by a succession of famous submarine cable companies from 1857 onwards, including Glass Elliot, W T Henley, Telcon, Submarine Cables Ltd, STC, Nortel and Alcatel.

The peninsula remained relatively remote from central London until the opening of the Blackwall Tunnel in 1897, and had no passenger railway or London Underground service until the opening of North Greenwich tube station on the Jubilee line in 1999.

Closure of the gasworks, power station and other industries in the late 20th century left much of the Greenwich Peninsula a barren wasteland, much of it heavily contaminated.

In the early years of the 21st century, surviving industries were mainly concentrated on the western side of the peninsula, between the river and the A102 Blackwall Tunnel southern approach road. They included Alcatel, a Tunnel Refiners/Amylum glucose plant (from 1976 until about 2008 part of Tate & Lyle) which closed in 2009, and two large marine aggregate terminals on the Delta Metals and Victoria Deep Water Terminal sites. One of the two gas holders also remains.

Redevelopment in the 1990s

Public and private investment since the early 1990s has brought about some dramatic changes in the peninsula's topography. In 1997 the national regeneration agency, English Partnerships, (now named the Homes and Communities Agency) purchased 1.21 square kilometres (300 acres) of disused land on the peninsula. The agency's investment of over £225m has helped to enhance the transport network and create new homes, commercial space and community facilities and to open up access to parkland along the river.

In addition to the construction of the Millennium Dome, new roads were built on the eastern side of the Peninsula in anticipation of new developments. New riverside walkways, cycle paths and public artworks were also created, including Antony Gormley's Quantum Cloud and A Slice of Reality, a work by Richard Wilson (in 2015, these were among five north Greenwich artworks incorporated into The Line, a public sculpture trail spanning the River Thames).

Two phases of Greenwich Millennium Village, a mixed-tenure residential development designed by architect Ralph Erskine , with a primary school, a medical centre, a nature reserve with associated education centre have been completed. A Holiday Inn hotel was also built nearby, and the Greenwich Yacht Club was relocated to a new site south-east of the Dome.

North Greenwich tube station on the Jubilee line opened in 1999. It is one of the largest London Underground stations and also has a bus station. The North Greenwich Pier offering commuter boat service to other parts of London, both east and west, is located on the Thames just to the east of the tube station.

In 2004 outline planning permission was granted for further large-scale redevelopment of the site, including over 10,000 further homes, some facing the river or overlooking the park,  of office space and the conversion of the Millennium Dome into an indoor arena, renamed The O2, which was used as a London 2012 venue. South of The O2, new public realms were created, Peninsula Square and Green Place. To the east of Peninsula Square is Ravensbourne University London, which relocated to Greenwich Peninsula in September 2010. In 2011, the university's campus won an award in the Royal Institute of British Architects (RIBA) Awards for London. From a shortlist of 55 schemes, the Ravensbourne building won the education and community category.

To the south east of the square, the six storey 14 Pier Walk building houses offices for Transport for London. Adjacent to this is the 11 storey 6 Mitre Passage office building. New restaurants and shops have opened facing onto Peninsula Square and Green Place.

Transport for London constructed a cable car over the River Thames just before the 2012 Summer Olympics began. This runs from a riverside station south-east of the O2 over the river to the Royal Victoria Dock west of the ExCeL Centre.

Adjacent to the cable car terminus was a large temporary building housing the London Soccer Dome, formerly the David Beckham Academy. This opened in 2005 and the building finally closed in 2014, with the main structures being dismantled, transported and re-erected in Southend; the site is intended for residential use. Approximately 400m further south, is the Pilot Inn public house, one of the oldest remaining buildings on the peninsula.

Central Park runs through the central spine of the peninsula, with the Greenwich Peninsula Ecology Park further south providing a haven for many different species of bird, plants and insects.

A combined heat and power (CHP) energy centre has been constructed adjacent to and east of the A102 Blackwall Tunnel Southern Approach to provide district heating to an eventual total of 15,700 properties on the peninsula. It is operated by Pinnacle Power for Greenwich Peninsula ESCO Limited. A 49 m high tower forms part of the energy centre, designed by C. F. Møller Architects, and was completed in 2016. The tower is clad in a complex metal cladding formed of hundreds of triangular patterns (initially titled 'Lenticular Dazzle Camouflage'), designed by British artist Conrad Shawcross. The tower cladding later featured as part of an art trail around north Greenwich, with the work given the title 'The Optic Cloak'.

In 2016, construction started on new buildings for St Mary Magdalene Church of England School (part of the Koinonia Federation; the federation then operated at four Greenwich sites, two of which moved to the new building on completion in September 2018). The school is located at the corner of Millennium Way and John Harrison Way, and has sports facilities available for community use.

Future development

The peninsula is now being developed with new homes at Peninsula Riverside, and Parkside Peninsula Quays. The redevelopment of Greenwich Peninsula is planned to take around 20 years. The improved access to the peninsula from Canary Wharf, the City and the West End via the Jubilee line has increased the prospects for continued residential regeneration.

External links

 GreenwichPeninsula.co.uk

References

Peninsulas of England
Geography of the Royal Borough of Greenwich
Districts of the Royal Borough of Greenwich
Districts of London on the River Thames
Redevelopment projects in London
Port of London